Pope Pius XII apostolic constitutions and bulls includes a listing of  all constitutions and bulls issued by Pope Pius XII (1939-1958)

 Bis saeculari (September 27, 1948)
 Christus Dominus (January 6, 1953)
 Exsul Familia (August 1, 1952)
 Munificentissimus Deus (November 1, 1950)
 Provida Mater Ecclesia  (February 2, 1947)
 Jubilaeum maximum (May 26, 1949) 
 Sedes sapientiae (May 31, 1956)
 Sponsa Christi (November 21, 1950)